The Aliens Act 1793 (33 Geo 3 c 4) was an Act of the Parliament of Great Britain regulating immigration into the country. Introduced into the House of Lords by Lord Grenville on 19 December 1792, the act was given high priority during the parliamentary session. Despite concerns of Opposition party, the Act became law on 8 January 1793.  

French Emigration (1789-1815) refers to the mass movement of citizens from France to neighbouring countries in reaction to the bloodshed and upheaval caused by the French Revolution and Napoleonic rule.  To escape political tensions and save their lives, many people left France and settled in the neighbouring countries (chiefly Great Britain, Germany, Austria, and Prussia), and a few went to the United States.  The number of refugees fleeing into Britain reached its climax in autumn of 1792. In September alone, a total of nearly 4000 refugees landed in Britain. The country appealed to people because it had a channel separating them from the revolutionaries and because it was known for being tolerant. Emigrants primarily settled in London and Soho, the latter had grown into a thriving French cultural district, complete with French hotels and cuisine, although it had long been a haven for French exiles, housing many thousands of Frenchmen from the last mass migration, of Huguenots, which occurred in reaction to the 1685 revocation of the Edict of Nantes, and the ensuing Foreign Protestants Naturalization Act 1708.

The uncontrolled influx of foreigners created significant anxiety in government circles. Particularly, the British Government feared the presence of spies and Jacobin agents disguised as refugees in the country. J. W. Bruges, secretary of the Foreign Office, wrote to Lord Grenville on 14 September: "By what I can learn, the majority of these people are of a suspicious description, and very likely either to do mischief of  their own accord, or to be fit  tools  of  those  who  may  be  desirous of creating  confusion". Additionally, the newspapers during the latter part of 1792 emphasized strong public suspicions of "Frenchmen in England" and demanded that high control and security measures be placed onto Britain.

The act enforced that aliens be recorded upon arrival and register with the local justice of the peace. More specifically, those who arrived in Great Britain after January 1793 were required to give their names, ranks, occupations, and addresses. Even those who housed or roomed with an alien had to send similar details. It further held that violators of the act could be held without bail or mainprise, either to be deported or as punishment, a provision that caused critics to decry it as a suspension of habeas corpus; indeed, its sponsor in Parliament had earlier called it "a bill for suspending the Habeas Corpus Act, as far as it should relate to the persons of foreigners."

During the war period, the Act gave an extraordinary power to the government and placed all foreigners in the country at the mercy of the government. All immigrants feared deportation because of either their political views or security reasons, or, simply because they were regarded as an undesirable persons. Despite in theory being an emergency measured to be renewed annually, it remained in force for over thirty years.  Expulsions under the Act were limited but it very substantially restricted immigration to Great Britain. Whilst designed for the fear that Jacobins might be hidden amongst royalists fleeing from the French Revolution, it caught all aliens coming to the country and hence had led to sharp decline in Jewish immigration to Great Britain.

See also
Alien Office
Aliens Act 1905
History of UK immigration control

Notes

External links
Text of the Act

Great Britain Acts of Parliament 1793
Immigration legislation
History of immigration to the United Kingdom
Political repression in the United Kingdom